Acanthella dendyi is a marine sessile filter-feeder sponge in the family Dictyonellidae, first described by Patricia Bergquist in 1970 as Phakellia dendyi

Distribution 
In Australian waters it is found from Victorian coastal water, all the way up the east coast to Queensland and then all the way across the northern coasts  to the north-west coast of Western Australia, at depths from 8 - 180 m.

References

External links 

 Distribution in Australian coastal waters

Taxa named by Patricia Bergquist
Demospongiae